Sig Libowitz (born March 1, 1968) is an American lawyer, actor, film executive, writer and producer.
Libowitz is notable for writing, producing, and acting in a film, The Response, which he wrote after reading the actual transcripts from the Guantanamo detainees' Combatant Status Review Tribunals.

Education 
Libowitz earned a Bachelor of Arts degree in theatre and politics from New York University and a Juris Doctor from the University of Maryland School of Law in 2007. One of Libowitz's professors at law school distributed Guantanamo transcripts to his class. Libowitz decided the transcript could be turned into a script.

Career 
From 2007 to 2012, Libowitz worked for the law firm Venable LLP.

Libowitz was a vice president of acquisitions and co-productions at Paramount Pictures. Prior to that, he was an executive at Film4 and Good Machine, where he oversaw production of the Academy Award-nominated film, In The Bedroom, starring Sissy Spacek, Tom Wilkinson, and Marisa Tomei. As an actor, Libowitz had recurring roles in The Sopranos and Law & Order.

The Response has screened at the Pentagon, United States Congress, United States Department of Justice, the United States Military Academy, and numerous universities including Harvard University, UCLA, and Columbia University. The Response was shortlisted for the 2010 Academy Award (Best Live Action Short) and won the 2009 ABA Award as Best of the Year in Drama and Literature. Previous ABA winners include To Kill a Mockingbird, Twelve Angry Men, and Judgment at Nuremberg.

Peter Riegert, Kate Mulgrew star as the two other JAG officers on the Tribunal. Aasif Mandvi stars as the detainee.

Filmography

Film

Television

References

American lawyers
Living people
1968 births